The 2014–15 Ole Miss Rebels women's basketball team represented University of Mississippi during the 2014–15 NCAA Division I women's basketball season. The Rebels, who were led by second-year head coach Matt Insell, played their home games at Tad Smith Coliseum and are members of the Southeastern Conference. They finished the season 19–14, 7–9 in SEC play to finish in a tie for seventh place. They lost in the second round of the SEC women's basketball tournament to Arkansas. They were invited to the Women's National Invitation Tournament where they defeated Tennessee–Martin in the first round, Georgia Tech in the second round before losing to Middle Tennessee in the third round.

Roster

Schedule

|-
!colspan=9 style=""| Exhibition

|-
!colspan=9 style=""| Non-conference regular season

|-
!colspan=9 style=""| SEC regular season

|-
!colspan=9 style=""| SEC Women's Tournament

|-
!colspan=9 style=""| WNIT

Source

See also
2014–15 Ole Miss Rebels men's basketball team

References

Ole Miss Rebels women's basketball seasons
Ole Miss
Ole Miss Rebels
Ole Miss Rebels